East Northamptonshire was from 1974 to 2021 a local government district in Northamptonshire, England. Its council was based in Thrapston and Rushden. Other towns include Oundle, Raunds, Irthlingborough and Higham Ferrers. The town of Rushden was by far the largest settlement in the district. The population of the district at the 2011 Census was 86,765.

The district bordered onto the Borough of Corby, the Borough of Kettering, the Borough of Wellingborough, the Borough of Bedford, the City of Peterborough, the District of Huntingdonshire, South Kesteven District and the unitary authority county of Rutland.

The district was formed on 1 April 1974, under the Local Government Act 1972, by a merger of the municipal borough of Higham Ferrers, with the urban districts of Irthlingborough, Oundle, Raunds and Rushden, along with Oundle and Thrapston Rural District, and Newton Bromswold from Wellingborough Rural District.

Much of the district was home to Rockingham Forest, once a Royal hunting forest which takes its name from the village of Rockingham where William I built a castle.

The district was home to several of Northamptonshire's airfields including Spanhoe, King's Cliffe, Deenethorpe, Polebrook, Chelveston and Lyveden.

Abolition and replacement
In March 2018, following suspension of the County Council arising from its becoming insolvent, due to financial and cultural mismanagement by the cabinet and officers, the then Secretary of State for Local Government, Sajid Javid, sent commissioner Max Caller into the council, who recommended the county council and all district and borough councils in the county be abolished, and replaced by two unitary authorities, one covering the West, and one the North of the county. These proposals were approved in April 2019. It meant that the districts of Daventry, Northampton and South Northamptonshire were merged to form a new unitary authority called West Northamptonshire, whilst the second unitary authority North Northamptonshire consists of Corby, East Northamptonshire, Kettering and Wellingborough districts. These new authorities came into being on 1 April 2021. Elections for the new authorities were due to be held on 7 May 2020, but were delayed due to the COVID-19 pandemic.

Geography
There were six towns in the district.  Rushden was by far the largest with a population of 29,272.  It is situated in the very south of the district and forms a single urban area with the neighbouring town of Higham Ferrers which has a population of 7,145.  The second largest town in the district was Raunds, population 8,641 followed closely by Irthlingborough, population 8,535.  The smallest town in the district was Thrapston where the HQ of the East Northamptonshire council was located. Oundle is a historical market town with many ancient buildings, including St Peter's parish church with the tallest spire in the county and a large Public School. Higham Ferrers, which is part of Rushden's urban area, was the birthplace for Henry Chichele and chichele college.  Irthlingborough was home to Rushden & Diamonds Football Club before it went into liquidation.

There were no railway stations in East Northamptonshire. There is one College in East Northamptonshire.

Election results

2019 no election in any of the Northamptonshire districts, following a budgetary overspending crisis and subsequent plans to merge East Northamptonshire local authority with three other districts/boroughs to form a unitary authority of North Northamptonshire. In the meantime, councillors terms of office were extended at least up to 2020.

2015 (total 40 seats)

Conservative - 37 seats (+2)
Labour - 1 seats (-1)
Independent - 2 seats (-1)

2011 (total 40 seats)

Conservative - 35 seats (-4)
Labour - 2 seats (+2)
Independent - 3 seats (+2)

2007 (total 40 seats)

Conservative - 39 seats (+ 6)
Labour - 0 seats ( - 3)
Independent - 1 seat

2004 (total 36 seats)

Conservative - 33 seats (+ 12)
Labour - 3 seats (- 12)

Settlements and parishes

Achurch, Aldwincle, Apethorpe, Ashton
Barnwell, Benefield, Blatherwycke, Brigstock, Bulwick
Chelveston cum Caldecott, Clopton, Collyweston, Cotterstock
Deene, Deenethorpe, Denford, Duddington-with-Fineshade
Easton-on-the-Hill
Fotheringhay
Glapthorn, Great Addington
Hargrave, Harringworth, Hemington, Higham Ferrers
Irthlingborough, Islip
King's Cliffe
Laxton, Lilford-cum-Wigsthorpe
Little Addington, Lowick, Luddington, Lutton
Nassington, Newton Bromswold
Oundle
Pilton, Polebrook
Raunds, Ringstead, Rushden
Shotley, Southwick, Stanwick, Stoke Doyle, Sudborough
Tansor, Thrapston, Thurning, Thorpe Waterville, Titchmarsh, Thorpe Achurch, Twywell
Wadenhoe, Wakerley, Warmington, Woodford, Woodnewton
Yarwell

See also

 Grade I listed buildings in East Northamptonshire
 Grade II* listed buildings in East Northamptonshire

References

External links
Nene Valley News Community Newspaper
Extra Local Newspaper
East Northamptonshire Council Local Authority

 
Former non-metropolitan districts
Non-metropolitan districts of Northamptonshire
2021 disestablishments in England
North Northamptonshire